Below is a list of notable footballers who have played for Chonburi.

List of players

Key to positions

 
Chonburi
Association football player non-biographical articles